Minivan News is a private news website which was initially linked to Minivan Daily but in recent years has been editorially independent. It has a good reputation among diplomats and Maldivians abroad as a reliable news source.

External links
  Minivan Daily website
  Minivan News website

Publications established in 2005
Newspapers published in the Maldives
English-language newspapers published in Asia